National Women's Organization (NOK) (Polish: Narodowa Organizacja Kobiet) was a Polish women's organisation. It was founded in 1918 as a branch of the National Democracy party. It was a Catholic Conservative women's association who encouraged conservative women to participate in society.

References
 Robert Kotowski: Między polityką a działalnością społeczną - Narodowa Organizacja Kobiet w dwudziestoleciu międzywojennym. W: Agnieszka Janiak-Jasińska, Katarzyna Sierakowska, Andrzej Szwarc: Działaczki społeczne, feministki, obywatelki. Samoorganizowanie się kobiet po 1918 roku (na tle porównawczym). T. II. Warszawa: Wydawnictwo Neriton, 2009, s. 275-286. . (pol.)

1918 in Poland
Feminist organisations in Poland
1918 establishments in Poland
Women's wings of political parties
National Democracy